Back to the Old School is the debut album by American rapper Just-Ice. It was released in 1986, and was produced by Kurtis Mantronik.  The album has been described as a classic early hip-hop album and revolutionary for its time by Allmusic.

Track listing 
 "Cold Gettin' Dumb" (Just-Ice, Kurtis Mantronik) – 4:32
 "Love Story" (Just-Ice, Mantronik) – 4:54
 "Back to the Old School" (Just-Ice, Mantronik) – 4:50
 "Latoya" (Just-Ice, Mantronik) – 4:12
 "Gangster of Hip Hop" (Just-Ice, Mantronik) – 5:09
 "Little Bad Johnny" (Just-Ice, Mantronik) – 3:32
 "Put the Record Back On" (Just-Ice, Mantronik) – 3:51
 "Turbo-Charged" (Just-Ice, Mantronik) – 5:11
 "Cold Gettin' Dumb II"  (Just Ice, Mantronik) – 6:33 (Originally a 12-inch single, it was added when the album was released on CD)
 "That Girl is a Slut"  (Just-Ice) – 5:16 (Originally a b-side, it was added when the album was released on CD)

The album cover artwork was done by Gnome and Gemini/Gem7 (Prez and Vice, respectively of the CWK - Craftwork Kings graffiti crew)

Charts

References

External links 
 Back to the Old School at Allmusic
 Back to the Old School at Discogs

1986 debut albums
Just-Ice albums
Fresh Records (US) albums
Albums produced by Kurtis Mantronik